Jignas Chittibomma (born 12 January 1994) is an Indian archer.  He is noted for being instrumental in India's 2nd-place finish in the 2010 Commonwealth Games.

Early life
Chittibomma had a superlative performance at the schooling age of 14, while studying class IX, in Second South Asian Archery championship held in Jamshedpur. 
This was as a member of the Volga Archery academy under international coach Lenin, which won the Silver medal from E. S. L. Narasimhan, Governor of Andhra Pradesh and K. Roshaiah, Chief Minister of Andhra Pradesh.

2010 Common wealth game
He is noted as the youngest archer in India's team and being instrumental in winning team silver medal in Commonwealth Games of 2010 that was held at New Delhi in India  by defeating South Africa with 226–224 in semifinal and settled for silver medal by losing to England in final with 229-231 points. Jignas was instrumental in entering final by scoring 78 points out of 80.

(8 Arrows) in semi final and scored a record of 79 points out of 80(8 Arrows) to win silver medal by the Indian team comprising Ritul Chatterjee and Chinna alias Raju Sridhar. Jignas is also credited for being youngest boy at the age of 14 years to participate in all Sub Junior, Junior and Senior Nationals in one single year between 2007 and 2008 held in India and Turkey. He is also credited for being youngest boy of 16 years old to play in Senior Archery world cup held in Croatia in 2010.

Personal Details
Jignas was born on 12 January 1994, to  Sri. Ch.V. Rajasekhar an Irrigation Engineer and Smt. Ch. Nalini at Vijaywada in Andhra Pradesh.

His fine skills were first noticed by his father when he was shooting darts accurately and took up archery at the age of 8 in May 2002 as he has facilities for archery training in his native place, although he was actually interested in
shooting.

Participated Events
 Won 5 Gold Medals at Sub Juniors 49th National Schools held at Sangli in Maharashtra during 2004 and stood national first.
 Won 1 Silver Medal at Sub Juniors 50th National Schools held at Kolkata in West Bengal during 2005 and stood national second.
 Won 1 Bronze Medal at Sub Juniors 51st National Schools held at Amravati in Maharashtra during 2006 and stood national third.
 Won 1 Bronze Medal at Sub Juniors National Archery Championship held at Raipur in Chhattisgarh during 2007 and stood national sixth.
 Won 4 Gold Medals, 1 Silver and 1 Bronze at Sub Juniors National Archery Championship held at Jabalpur in Madhya Pradesh during 2007 and stood national first.
 Won 1 Silver and 1 Bronze Medal at Juniors National Archery Championship held at Amravati in Maharashtra during 2007 and stood national third. This also secured an opportunity to represent India at International stage.
 Stood 3rd in both 30 meters and 90 meters and 4th in 50 meters in South Asian Junior Archery Championship held at Tata Nagar in Jamshedpur.
 Participated in Youth World Championship and stood 15th in Cadet rank held at Antalya in Turkey.
 Participated in Senior National Archery Championship held at Tata Nagar in Jamshedpur during 2008 and stood national twenty first.
 Won 2 Gold, 2 Silver and 2 Bronze Medals at Junior National Archery Championship held at Raipur in Chhattisgarh during 2009 and stood national first and also became national champion.
 Won 1 Team Bronze Medal at Senior National Archery Championship held at Guwahati in Assam in 2010.
 Participated and stood 65th in Achery World Cup held at Porec in Croatia in 2010.
 Won 1 Team Silver Medal in Commonwealth Games 2010 held at New Delhi in India.

References

External links
 http://jeetlocwg.in/site/ch-jignas/
 https://web.archive.org/web/20101027083125/http://www.ndtv.com/article/sports/archery-coach-lenin-dies-in-accident-cwg-medallist-unhurt-61976
 
 https://web.archive.org/web/20101027083125/http://www.ndtv.com/article/sports/archery-coach-lenin-dies-in-accident-cwg-medallist-unhurt-61976
 
 
 
 https://web.archive.org/web/20100420065842/http://connect.in.com/commonwealth-games/profile-543083.html
 http://www.deccanherald.com/content/107092/former-india-archer-lenin-dies.html
 http://timesofindia.indiatimes.com/topic/article/043C6Qq2NCeY2?q=Commonwealth+Games
 https://web.archive.org/web/20120311101942/http://www.timesnow.tv/Vijaywada-Archery-coach-dies-in-car-mishap/articleshow/4356751.cms

Living people
Telugu people
1994 births
Commonwealth Games medallists in archery
Commonwealth Games silver medallists for India
Indian male archers
Archers at the 2010 Commonwealth Games
Medallists at the 2010 Commonwealth Games